This article describes the history of computer hardware in Bulgaria. At its peak, Bulgaria supplied 40% of the computers in the socialist economic union COMECON. The electronics industry employed 300,000 workers, and it generated 8 billion rubles a year. Since the democratic changes in 1989 and the subsequent chaotic political and economic conditions, the once blooming Bulgarian computer industry almost completely disintegrated.

Computer models
In the 1980s, Bulgaria manufactured computers according to an agreement within the COMECON:

Mainframes
IZOT series and ES EVM series (abbreviation from Edinnaya Sistema Elektronno Vichislitelnih Machin, or Unified Computer System — created in 1969 by USSR, Bulgaria, Hungary, GDR, Poland and Czechoslovakia).

Personal computers
 IMKO, Pravetz-82/8M/8A/8E/8C — an 8-bit machine (Apple II clones), based on Bulgarian-made 6502 variants, Pravetz-16/16A/16H/286 (16-bit) — IBM PC clones based on i8088(V20)/286.
 IZOT 1030 — based on East German-made U880 (a Z80A clone), IZOT 1036C -IBM PC compatible based on i8086, IZOT 1037C - IBM PC/XT clone based on i8088,

For example, the Pravetz-8M featured two processors (primary: Bulgarian-made clone of 6502, designated SM630 at 1.018 MHz, secondary: Z80A at 4 MHz), 64 KB DRAM and 16 KB EPROM.

Production facilities
Another big facility was the plant "Electronika" in Sofia. Smaller plants throughout the country produced monitors and peripherals, notably DZU (Diskovi Zapametyavashti Ustroistva — Disk Memory Devices) — Stara Zagora made hard disks for mainframes and personal computers.

See also
 History of computer hardware in Yugoslavia
 Computer systems in the Soviet Union
 History of computing in Romania
 History of computing in Poland

References

External links
 Bulgarian Computers
 Bulgarian Computers Information File

Information technology in Bulgaria
Bulgaria